Wataru Miki   (born August 26, 1980) is a Japanese mixed martial artist. He competed in the Featherweight and Lightweight divisions.

Mixed martial arts record

|-
| Loss
| align=center| 20-14-6
| Shigeki Osawa
| Decision (Unanimous)
| Shooto: 1st Round 2015
| 
| align=center| 3
| align=center| 5:00
| Tokyo, Japan
| 
|-
| Loss
| align=center| 20-13-6
| Takumi Nakayama
| Submission (Rear-Naked Choke)
| Vale Tudo Japan: VTJ 5th in Osaka
| 
| align=center| 2
| align=center| 2:29
| Osaka, Japan
| 
|-
| Loss
| align=center| 20-12-6
| Jae Woong Kim
| Decision (Unanimous)
| Vale Tudo Japan: VTJ 4th
| 
| align=center| 3
| align=center| 5:00
| Ota, Tokyo, Japan
| 
|-
| Win
| align=center| 20-11-6
| Jung Gyeong Lee
| Submission (Rear-Naked Choke)
| Shooto: 1st Round 2013
| 
| align=center| 2
| align=center| 2:57
| Tokyo, Japan
| 
|-
| Loss
| align=center| 19-11-6
| Yusuke Yachi
| Decision (Unanimous)
| Shooto: 12th Round
| 
| align=center| 3
| align=center| 5:00
| Tokyo, Japan
| 
|-
| Win
| align=center| 19-10-6
| Yoshifumi Nakamura
| Decision (Split)
| Shooto: 5th Round
| 
| align=center| 3
| align=center| 5:00
| Tokyo, Japan
| 
|-
| Draw
| align=center| 18-10-6
| Guy Delumeau
| Draw (Split)
| Shooto: Survivor Tournament Final
| 
| align=center| 3
| align=center| 5:00
| Tokyo, Japan
| 
|-
| Draw
| align=center| 18-10-5
| Tenkei Oda
| Draw (Split)
| Shooto: Shooto the Shoot 2011
| 
| align=center| 3
| align=center| 5:00
| Tokyo, Japan
| 
|-
| Win
| align=center| 18-10-4
| Ikuo Usuda
| Submission (Rear-Naked Choke)
| Shooto: Shootor's Legacy 3
| 
| align=center| 3
| align=center| 2:20
| Tokyo, Japan
| 
|-
| Win
| align=center| 17-10-4
| Takayoshi Ono
| Submission (Inverted Triangle Armbar)
| Shooto: Shootor's Legacy 2
| 
| align=center| 2
| align=center| 4:06
| Tokyo, Japan
| 
|-
| Draw
| align=center| 16-10-4
| Guy Delumeau
| Draw
| Shooto: Gig Tokyo 5
| 
| align=center| 2
| align=center| 5:00
| Tokyo, Japan
| 
|-
| Loss
| align=center| 16-10-3
| Shintaro Ishiwatari
| Decision (Majority)
| Shooto: The Way of Shooto 3: Like a Tiger, Like a Dragon
| 
| align=center| 2
| align=center| 5:00
| Tokyo, Japan
| 
|-
| Win
| align=center| 16-9-3
| Jin Suk Jung
| KO (Knee to the Body)
| Shooto: The Way of Shooto 1: Like a Tiger, Like a Dragon
| 
| align=center| 1
| align=center| 3:15
| Tokyo, Japan
| 
|-
| Win
| align=center| 15-9-3
| Tomonori Taniguchi
| Submission (Rear-Naked Choke)
| GCM: Cage Force 12
| 
| align=center| 3
| align=center| 4:36
| Tokyo, Japan
| 
|-
| Loss
| align=center| 14-9-3
| Hiroshi Nakamura
| Decision (Majority)
| GCM: Cage Force 10
| 
| align=center| 3
| align=center| 5:00
| Tokyo, Japan
| 
|-
| Win
| align=center| 14-8-3
| Masaaki Hasegawa
| Submission (Armbar)
| GCM: Cage Force 9
| 
| align=center| 3
| align=center| 1:40
| Tokyo, Japan
| 
|-
| Draw
| align=center| 13-8-3
| Tomohiko Hori
| Draw
| GCM: Cage Force 8
| 
| align=center| 3
| align=center| 5:00
| Tokyo, Japan
| 
|-
| Win
| align=center| 13-8-2
| Tetsuo Uehata
| TKO (Punches)
| GCM: Demolition 080721
| 
| align=center| 1
| align=center| 2:28
| Japan
| 
|-
| Loss
| align=center| 12-8-2
| Yoshihiro Koyama
| Decision (Unanimous)
| GCM: Cage Force 6
| 
| align=center| 3
| align=center| 5:00
| Tokyo, Japan
| 
|-
| Win
| align=center| 12-7-2
| Kiyonobu Nishikata
| Decision (Unanimous)
| GCM: Cage Force EX Eastern Bound
| 
| align=center| 2
| align=center| 5:00
| 
| 
|-
| Loss
| align=center| 11-7-2
| Jadamba Narantungalag
| Decision (Unanimous)
| IMPERIAL: Imperial
| 
| align=center| 2
| align=center| 5:00
| Ulan Bator, Mongolia
| 
|-
| Loss
| align=center| 11-6-2
| Artur Oumakhanov
| Decision (Split)
| GCM: Cage Force 3
| 
| align=center| 3
| align=center| 5:00
| Tokyo, Japan
| 
|-
| Win
| align=center| 11-5-2
| Yasunori Kanehara
| TKO (Doctor Stoppage)
| GCM: Cage Force EX Western Bound
| 
| align=center| 2
| align=center| 1:21
| Tottori, Japan
| 
|-
| Win
| align=center| 10-5-2
| Yoshinori Ikeda
| Decision (Unanimous)
| GCM: Cage Force 1
| 
| align=center| 2
| align=center| 5:00
| Tokyo, Japan
| 
|-
| Draw
| align=center| 9-5-2
| Koji Yoshida
| Draw
| GCM: D.O.G. 7
| 
| align=center| 2
| align=center| 5:00
| Tokyo, Japan
| 
|-
| Win
| align=center| 9-5-1
| Yasunori Kanehara
| Decision (Majority)
| GCM: D.O.G. 6
| 
| align=center| 2
| align=center| 5:00
| Tokyo, Japan
| 
|-
| Win
| align=center| 8-5-1
| Hiromitsu Bito
| Submission (Kimura)
| GCM: Demolition 060320
| 
| align=center| 2
| align=center| 3:37
| Japan
| 
|-
| Win
| align=center| 7-5-1
| Komei Okada
| Decision (Unanimous)
| Shooto: 12/17 in Shinjuku Face
| 
| align=center| 2
| align=center| 5:00
| Tokyo, Japan
| 
|-
| Win
| align=center| 6-5-1
| Evaldo Santos
| TKO (Knees)
| GCM: Demolition 051027
| 
| align=center| 1
| align=center| 1:59
| Japan
| 
|-
| Loss
| align=center| 5-5-1
| Tomonari Kanomata
| Decision (Unanimous)
| Shooto: 9/23 in Korakuen Hall
| 
| align=center| 2
| align=center| 5:00
| Tokyo, Japan
| 
|-
| Win
| align=center| 5-4-1
| Yuki Takaya
| Submission (Kimura)
| GCM: Demolition 050727
| 
| align=center| 2
| align=center| 3:01
| Tokyo, Japan
| 
|-
| Win
| align=center| 4-4-1
| Takahiro Kajita
| Decision (Split)
| Shooto: 2/6 in Kitazawa Town Hall
| 
| align=center| 2
| align=center| 5:00
| Setagaya, Tokyo, Japan
| 
|-
| Win
| align=center| 3-4-1
| Ken Omatsu
| Decision (Unanimous)
| Shooto 2004: 10/17 in Osaka Prefectural Gymnasium
| 
| align=center| 2
| align=center| 5:00
| Osaka, Kansai, Japan
| 
|-
| Loss
| align=center| 2-4-1
| Kabuto Kokage
| Decision (Unanimous)
| Shooto 2004: 7/4 in Kitazawa Town Hall
| 
| align=center| 2
| align=center| 5:00
| Setagaya, Tokyo, Japan
| 
|-
| Loss
| align=center| 2-3-1
| Koji Takeuchi
| Submission (Armbar)
| Shooto 2004: 4/16 in Kitazawa Town Hall
| 
| align=center| 1
| align=center| 4:11
| Setagaya, Tokyo, Japan
| 
|-
| Win
| align=center| 2-2-1
| Hirotaka Tomiyama
| TKO (Punches)
| GCM: Demolition Atom 5
| 
| align=center| 2
| align=center| 2:26
| Tokyo, Japan
| 
|-
| Win
| align=center| 1-2-1
| Junpei Chikano
| Decision (Unanimous)
| GCM: Demolition Atom 4
| 
| align=center| 2
| align=center| 5:00
| Shibuya, Japan
| 
|-
| Draw
| align=center| 0-2-1
| Tashiro Nishiuchi
| Draw
| GCM: Demolition 030923
| 
| align=center| 2
| align=center| 5:00
| Japan
| 
|-
| Loss
| align=center| 0-2
| Ken Yasuda
| Decision (40-37)
| GCM: ORG 3rd
| 
| align=center| 2
| align=center| 5:00
| Tokyo, Japan
| 
|-
| Loss
| align=center| 0-1
| Shinya Sato
| Submission (Armbar)
| Deep: 3rd Impact
| 
| align=center| 2
| align=center| 3:28
| Tokyo, Japan
|

See also
List of male mixed martial artists

References

External links
 

1980 births
Japanese male mixed martial artists
Featherweight mixed martial artists
Lightweight mixed martial artists
Mixed martial artists utilizing wrestling
Living people